Christ Church Lille is an English-speaking Anglican Church  located in the city of Lille in Nord-Pas-de-Calais, the Flemish area of France. Christ Church Lille is part of the Church of England, Diocese in Europe.

Location
The church, on Rue Lydéric, is within walking distance of Gare de Lille Flandres, Gare de Lille Europe and the city centre as well as tourist attractions such as the Palais des Beaux-Arts de Lille.

History

An English Church in Lille: early days

There were English residents in the Lille area from the first half of the 19th century. They were workers or businessmen, and were mostly engaged in commerce or manufacturing, particularly in areas related to the busy textile industry of the time. The French Reformed Church looked after their spiritual needs, and it was not until the middle of the century that services were held in English, mainly by a certain W. B. Edwards and other lay people. There is a brass memorial plate to the memory of Edwards and his wife, and the brass lectern was also given in his name.

For the first time, services were held by an ordained minister from 1848 to 1857 and a memorial window to the Reverend W. Meston can be seen in the church vestry.

A permanent home

Services were held in different rooms not only in Lille but also in Croix and Armentières, but by 1860, there was the first proposal for a permanent place of worship. A plot of land originally belonging to the military and ceded to the town of Lille was given over for the building of an Anglican church. The cost of building the church was to be born entirely by the British community in Lille and once complete, although the building would belong to the town, it would be destined exclusively and in perpetuity for the usage of the Anglican church, in the charge of an Anglican minister.  

The church was built in a modern Gothic style, but based on 13th century French Gothic – the capitals of the front door columns are good examples of this style. The East end of the church is however in the form of a half octagon, a compromise between the usual English square and the French semicircle.

Improvements

The church hall beneath the church was fitted up and was used not only for the Sunday school and various church gatherings, but also by the British Institute, formed in 1868 to provide a library and entertainments for British Residents. The harmonium was replaced by an organ, which originally ran on water power. This generally worked well, but on occasions when the water power failed, so did the organ. Afterwards, thanks to generous donations and subscriptions, a new and “superior” organ was installed in an organ chamber on the south side of the chancel, and removed from its original position next to the west door.

The ground around the church was paved: at the time, the church was entirely free-standing. The original gutters can still be seen in the present covered passage leading to the lavatories, which were not added until much later.

The Great War

On 13 October 1914, after a siege and heavy bombardment, Lille was occupied and came under German administration. The Lillois were cut off from the rest of France: only 25 km from the front, it became a garrison town for the German army. Newspapers, cafés and the theatre were all renamed, and clocks and watches had to be set to Berlin time, one hour ahead.

The occupation lasted 4 years and 4 days. There were restrictions of all sorts, and extreme food shortages leading to malnutrition. But all through this time, the Reverend D. Moore refused to leave, and held services every Sunday. The marble tablet and honour roll bear witness to these years.

The Inter-war years

Bomb damage, broken stained glass windows and a leaky roof were all repaired or replaced during this time; electric light was installed and a new heating system too. It was also decided to repair the hall floor and walls, build two cloakrooms and install lavatories; it was at this time that the passageway to the east side of the church was covered in. Thanks to the town hall, the roof and the stained glass windows were replaced, but all the other works were paid for by donations and fund-raising events.

World War II

After France and Britain declared war on Germany on 3 September 1939, a new British Expeditionary Force made its way to France. Some of the troops were billeted in and around Lille. Many of them came to Christ Church, and many to the British Institute hall beneath the church, which was used for social events as well as for the library. Older members of our congregation can remember dances and music and the excitement of meeting the soldiers when they were children.

But in 1940, the battle for Lille was over and the Germans took over. Many British people were evacuated, others were interned. There was no permanent chaplain and indeed no regular services for many years, although the rural Dean and visiting priests came to Lille when the city was liberated in 1944.

The last 70 years

The difficulties in post-war France and England, the decline of the textile industry, together with changes in society, all had their effect. Congregations declined and for some years, there was no permanent Anglican priest in Lille; services were held less frequently. Fortunately, there were always visiting priests from Britain or other cities in France and Belgium to minister to the congregation.

New life and a new era came with the appointment of a permanent priest in 1998 and Christ Church is going from strength to strength.

References

External links
 

Churches in Nord (French department)
Buildings and structures in Lille
Christianity in Lille
Anglican church buildings in France
Diocese in Europe
19th-century churches in France
19th-century Anglican church buildings